Arthur Rougier (born 20 July 2000) is a French racing driver who is currently competing in the ADAC GT Masters with Emil Frey Racing. He was the 2017 French F4 champion and part of the Renault Sport Academy the following year.

Racing record

Racing career summary 

† As Rougier was a guest driver, he was ineligible for points.
*Season still in progress

Complete French F4 Championship results 
(key) (Races in bold indicate pole position) (Races in italics indicate fastest lap)

Complete Formula Renault Eurocup results
(key) (Races in bold indicate pole position) (Races in italics indicate fastest lap)

Complete GT World Challenge Europe Sprint Cup results
(key) (Races in bold indicate pole position) (Races in italics indicate fastest lap)

Complete ADAC GT Masters results
(key) (Races in bold indicate pole position) (Races in italics indicate fastest lap)

* Season still in progress.

References

External links 

 

Living people
2000 births
French racing drivers
Formula Renault Eurocup drivers
French F4 Championship drivers
ADAC GT Masters drivers
Formula Renault 2.0 NEC drivers
Emil Frey Racing drivers
Fortec Motorsport drivers
Saintéloc Racing drivers
Lamborghini Squadra Corse drivers